The White River (Jamaica) is a river of Jamaica.

See also
List of rivers of Jamaica

References
 GEOnet Names Server
OMC Map
CIA Map
Ford, Jos C. and Finlay, A.A.C. (1908).The Handbook of Jamaica. Jamaica Government Printing Office

External links
Aerial view of the mouth of the White River

Rivers of Jamaica